The 1980 Davis Cup was the 69th edition of the Davis Cup, the most important tournament between national teams in men's tennis. 52 teams would enter the competition, 30 in the Europe Zone, 12 in the Americas Zone, and 10 in the Eastern Zone.

Argentina defeated the United States in the Americas Inter-Zonal final, Australia defeated New Zealand in the Eastern Zone final, and Italy and Czechoslovakia were the winners of the two Europe Zones, defeating Sweden and Romania respectively.

In the Inter-Zonal Zone, Czechoslovakia defeated Argentina and Italy defeated Australia in the semifinals. Czechoslovakia then defeated Italy in the final to win their first title and become the eighth nation to win the Davis Cup. The final was held at the Sportovní hala in Prague, Czechoslovakia on 5–7 December.

Americas Zone

North & Central America Zone

Preliminary rounds

Main Draw

South America Zone

Preliminary rounds

Main Draw

Americas Inter-Zonal Final
Argentina vs. United States

Eastern Zone

Preliminary rounds

Main Draw

Final
Australia vs. New Zealand

Europe Zone

Zone A

Pre-qualifying round

Preliminary rounds

Main Draw

Final
Italy vs. Sweden

Zone B

Pre-qualifying round

Preliminary rounds

Main Draw

Final
Romania vs. Czechoslovakia

Inter-Zonal Zone

Draw

Semifinals
Argentina vs. Czechoslovakia

Italy vs. Australia

Final
Czechoslovakia vs. Italy

References

External links
Davis Cup Official Website

 
Davis Cups by year
Davis Cup
Davis Cup
Davis Cup
Davis Cup
Davis Cup
Davis Cup